This article about a judge in sumo. For a kind of a feudal domain in the Edo period, see Shinpan (daimyo).

 or Shinpan are the ring-side judges of a professional sumo bout.  In a sumo honbasho tournament five shimpan sit around the ring to observe which wrestler wins the matchup.  When judging tournament bouts they wear formal Japanese dress of otokomono, haori with mon, and hakama. At the end of each bout an initial decision is given by the gyōji (the ring referee), which is usually correct and no action is taken by the shimpan.

Five shimpan sit around the ring during the tournament. The order of importance of the shimpan is determined by where they sit. The order of importance goes North, East, South East, South West, West. They will rotate where they sit every day to maintain equality. However, during the top division only the chief shimpan and his two deputies may sit in the North. The South East shimpan also acts as the timekeeper and gives a signal to the gyōji (referee) when preparation time is up and the wrestlers should fight. Prior to September 1952 the raised shire roof (tsuriyane) was supported by columns and the shimpan would sit in front of the columns. 

If one of the shimpan disagrees or is unsure about the decision then he raises his hand and the five of them climb into the ring, or dohyō to hold a mono-ii.  A mono-ii (of the shimpan only) can in principle also be called by any of the four sumo wrestlers awaiting their bout around the ring, although it is an extremely rare occurrence.

During the mono-ii the five shimpan give their views on what happened.  The gyōji is usually able to listen in but is not expected to take part unless invited to do so. (In a famous case in January 1972, when the shimpan overruled the gyōji and said that Kitanofuji was the winner because his opponent was shini-tai and Kitanofuji was entitled to put his hand down first to prevent injury (kabai-te), the gyōji was seen to be arguing with the officials.)  Overturning a call can be a serious matter for a gyōji as he has to file a report and it can hinder his promotion, lead to suspension for a number of days, or in very rare cases resignation. For top division matches, the deliberations are further advised by two further shimpan in a video room, in communication with the chief shimpan (who is always one of the three senior members of the judging committee) via an audio link in his ear.

The use of video was brought in at a result of a famous bout in March 1969 in which the yokozuna Taihō was adjudged to have lost the bout despite subsequent replays and photographs indicating otherwise. The referee had originally given the victory to Taihō, but the judges reversed his decision. The loss of this bout broke an extremely unusual 45 bout winning streak by the yokozuna and consequently the decision received much adverse publicity. One of the two shimpan in the video booth must now also be one of the three most senior judges. This rule was brought in as a result of judging controversies in the 1990s.

The result of the mono-ii can be to uphold the gyōji's decision (so-called gunbai-dōri), reverse his decision (gunbai-sashichigai), or call a rematch (torinaoshi). Prior to 1926 draws (azukari) were allowed. The head shimpan is responsible for making the announcement and a brief explanation to the wrestlers and spectators.

All the shimpan are oyakata, or sumo elders, of the Japan Sumo Association and are members of its judging committee. At the end of each honbasho tournament the judging committee members also have the responsibility to decide the ranking of the wrestlers for the following tournament, which includes making the initial formal recommendation for the promotion of a wrestler to the rank of ōzeki to the Sumo Association board of directors. A special advisory body of external members is responsible for initial recommendations of promotion to the top rank of yokozuna.

The judging committee has 23 members at any one time. The three chief shimpan, who are nearly always former yokozuna or ōzeki, serve two-year terms, while the other 20 members serve one-year terms. An oyakata is normally expected to have reached at least a high maegashira rank as an active wrestler and must usually wait at least five years after retirement to become a shimpan. One exception was Nishonoseki (the 72nd yokozuna Kisenosato), who was named to the judging committee just three years after his retirement.

References

Sumo people
Sports officiating
Toshiyori